Ichche Nodee, also spelled as Ichchenodi, is a Bengali television soap opera that premiered on June 15, 2015, and aired on Star Jalsha. It was written by Leena Gangopadhyay and produced by Saibal Banerjee of Magic Moments Motion Pictures. It featured Vikram Chatterjee and Solanki Roy in lead roles, Sritama Bhattacharjee in a negative role, Aishwarya Sen in a negative role later positive, and Chandan Sen and Laboni Sarkar in pivotal roles. After running successfully for almost two years, the show ended on May 28, 2017, after airing 712 episodes.

Plot 
Ichchenodi is a story of sibling rivalry set within the premise of a love triangle. Ichhenodi basically revolves around a story of two sisters, Meghla and Adrija, and how they entangle themselves in a relationship with their love interest, Anurag.

Meghla, who finds the essence of her life in music, is fond of her elder sister Adrija, and loves her above anyone else. The sisters get caught up in a love triangle making their life go upside down. Meghla is proud of her elder sister Adrija as she is a smart, beautiful girl, who is a topper as well when it comes to study. However, Adrija despises her since childhood and hates her after she discovers that Meghla is not her own sister but adopted. Adrija begins to love Anurag madly but Anurag falls in love with the simple and docile Meghla, and her passion for music. Meghla refuses him and tries to convince him to marry Adrija but circumstances compel them to marry each other. Adrija creates many misunderstandings to destroy the marital life of Meghla and Anurag, but their love conquers every time. Adrija even goes to the extent of trying to kill Meghla on many occasions, but in vain. In frustration, she pushes Anurag from a cliff, who is then saved by Tua, also a passionate singer. Anurag loses his memory in the accident and is named "Vikram" by Tua and her family. Tua starts loving Vikram, without knowing his past. Adrija now marries Piklu, Anurag's cousin and enters his family to torture Meghla and makes her life hell by instigating Malobika against her, rendering Meghla responsible for Anurag's supposed death and portrays Meghla as a cheap and characterless girl in the eyes of the family members. A distraught and lonely Meghla finds solace in music and is pacified by her Guru Maa, who turns out to be her own biological mother. She soon finds out that Anurag is alive and after many obstacles, they finally reunite (as Anurag's memory returns). Tua along with her aunt, Shariah then join forces with Adrija to separate Meghla from Anurag. They file a case against Anurag, accusing him of deceit and polygamy, but they fail due to the intervention of Adv. Shubhalakshmi, an experienced lawyer. Meghla also helps her to mend her broken relationship with her estranged husband, Adv. Anweshan. Meghla, who now despises Adrija from the core, exposes all her crimes and gets her arrested. Shattered and ashamed of her deeds, Tua changes herself and becomes a loyal confidante to Meghla, despite Anurag's initial reluctance. Adrija flees from police custody and takes the alias of "Mallika Dasgupta" to hide herself from the public eye. Deep Dasgupta, husband of the real Mallika (who is now dead), promises to help Adrija without knowledge of her true intentions. Soon Meghla gets pregnant and everyone in the family become happy. But their happiness is short-lived as Adrija kills Meghla's unborn baby. A devastated Anurag blames Meghla for everything and asks for a separation. Meghla, unable to bear Anurag's indifference, files for divorce, and soon, their divorce happens. Meghla restarts her singing career, while Deep helps to get Adrija arrested. Anurag decides to move to the United States. and spends a night with Meghla before his departure. Meghla gets pregnant again but decides to tell nobody about her prospective baby.

2 years later
A widowed Malobika misses Anurag and Meghla's presence in the family. Mimi, Anurag's elder cousin sister, returns home, as she promised to Anurag to take over the responsibilities of the Banerjee family in his absence, and also becomes a strong emotional support to Meghla. Meghla, who is now a famous playback singer, raises her son (with Anurag), namely Roddur single-handedly. Adrija returns in Piklu's life after her release from jail and consequent, change in disposition. She soon becomes pregnant and transforms into a good-hearted person who cares for Piklu and his family. She restores love her towards Meghla and like others, also wants Meghla and Anurag's reunion. Anurag becomes a famous playback singer known as "AB" in order to get close to Meghla. Lastly, Mimi and Sanjoy, Pagla Ghora (Anurag's uncle) and Shabnam get married. Meghla and Anurag too finally reunite and take care of the family and Roddur together. Adrija and Piklu too have a baby girl; and everything ends well for the Banerjees!

Cast

Main
Solanki Roy as Meghla Banerjee (née Sen) – An aspiring singer; Ustad and Kurchi's daughter; Chandan and Mahua's adoptive daughter; Adrija's adoptive sister; Anurag's wife; Roddur's mother
Vikram Chatterjee as Dr. Anurag Banerjee aka Tatan– A renowned surgeon; Amitabha and Malobika's son; Mishtu's brother; Meghla's husband; Roddur's father
Sritama Bhattacharjee as Adrija Banerjee (née Sen) aka Titir – Chandan and Mahua's daughter; Meghla's adoptive sister; Piklu's wife
Aishwarya Sen as Anindita Basu aka Tua – Anurag's rescuer turned lover

Recurring 

Dr. Basudeb Mukherjee as Dr. Agnideb Banerjee – Amitabha and Abir's brother; Urmimala's husband; Bumba and Mimi's father
Saswati Guha Thakurta as Dr. Urmimala Banerjee – Agnideb's wife; Piklu's maternal aunt, Bumba and Mimi's mother; Piklu's aunt
Biswajit Chakraborty as Amitabha Banerjee – Agnideb and Abir's brother; Malobika's late husband; Anurag and Mishtu's late father (Deceased)
Laboni Sarkar as Malobika Banerjee – Amitabha's widow; Anurag and Mishtu's mother
Rajasree Bhowmick as Nandini Banerjee – Agnideb, Amitabha and Abir's cousin
Sujan Mukhopadhyay as Abir Banerjee – Agnideb and Amitabha's brother; Shabnam's husband
Nibedita Mukherjee as Shabnam Banerjee – Abir's wife
Suman Banerjee as Dr. Bumba Banerjee – Agnideb and Urmimala's son; Mimi's brother; Kajari's husband
Rajanya Mitra as Kajari Banerjee – Bumba's wife
Asmee Ghosh as Bumba and Kajori's daughter
Sonali Chowdhury as Mimi Banerjee Chakraborty – Agnideb and Urmimala's daughter; Bumba's sister; Sanjoy's wife
Rahul Chakraborty as Sanjoy Chakraborty – Mimi's husband
Dwaipayan Das as Piklu Banerjee – Urmimala's nephew; Anurag and Mishtu's cousin; Adrija's husband
Ritu Rai Acharya as Mishtu Banerjee aka Arna – Malobika and Amitabha's daughter; Anurag's sister
Chandan Sen as Prof. Chandan Sen – Mahua's husband; Adrija's father; Meghla's adoptive father
Subhadra Mukherjee as Mahua Sen – Chandan's wife; Adrija's mother; Meghala's adoptive mother
Abhishek Chatterjee as Ustad Rashid Ali – Kurchi's husband; Meghla's father and mentor
Rita Dutta Chakraborty as Kurchi Majumdar Rashid Ali – Ustad's wife; Meghla's mother
Sonal Mishra as Munni Dasgupta – Deep's sister
Anusuya Majumdar as Malobika's mother
Santu Mukherjee as Abhinash Mukherjee – Tua's adoptive father
Swarnava Sanyal as Bumba and Kajori's son
Sreela Majumdar as Sharmistha Mukherjee – Abhinash's wife and Tua's paternal aunt as well as adoptive mother
Bhaswar Chatterjee as Adv. Anweshan Ghosh – Subhalakshmi's husband
Debolina Dutta Mukherjee as Adv. Subhalakshmi Ghosh – Anweshan's wife
Anindya Chatterjee as Deep Dasgupta – Mallika's husband, Adrija's (fake) husband when she impersonated Mallika
Riyaa Ganguly
Sourav Majumdar as Deep's brother
Shankar Chakraborty as Abin Majumdar
Prantik Banerjee as Subhankar
Avrajit Chakraborty as Subhro Shankar

See also
 Phagun Bou
 Kusum Dola
 Ishti Kutum

References

External links
 Ichche Nodee at Disney+ Hotstar
 

2015 Indian television series debuts
Bengali-language television programming in India
2017 Indian television series endings
Star Jalsha original programming